Tin Aye (born 20 October 1945) is a retired Burmese lieutenant general and previously chaired the country's Union Election Commission (UEC). In the 2010 Burmese general election, he contested a Pyithu Hluttaw seat in Tada-U Township and won. However, he vacated his seat in February 2011 to assume a new position, as Chairman of the UEC. He graduated from the Defence Services Academy and is a decorated soldier, having received 15 decorations. He formerly served as the chairman of Union of Myanmar Economic Holdings (UMEH), an conglomerate owned by the Burmese military.

References

Burmese military personnel
Burmese politicians
People from Mandalay Region
1948 births
Living people